Channasandra railway station (station code: CSDR) serves the rail needs of the areas of K.Channasandra, Ramamurthy Nagar, Dooravani Nagar and other nearby areas of East Bengaluru. It has 2 platforms and basic amenities to cater the needs of the passengers. The station is a part of the proposed Bangalore Suburban Railway network.

References 

Railway stations in Bangalore
Bangalore railway division